Bandy is a winter sport.

Bandy may also refer to:

 Bandy (carriage), a cart used in India and Sri Lanka
 Bandy (surname), a surname
 Bandy-bandy, a snake
 Bandy Creek, Western Australia, suburb in Australia
 Bandy Farms Historic District, United States
 Bandy Island, Antarctica
 Bandy, Virginia, an unincorporated community in the United States
 Dr. Robert W. Bandy House, historic house in the United States
 "Bandy legs" or "bandiness"; see genu varum

See also
 
 
 Bandi (disambiguation)
 Band (disambiguation)